Nürnberg-Ostring station is a Nuremberg S-Bahn railway station on the Nuremberg–Schwandorf railway at the intersection with the B 4 ring road ("B 4 R", this section named Cheruskerstraße) in the Tullnau neighbourhood of Nuremberg, Bavaria, Germany.

Nürnberg–Ostring opened on 26 September 1987 with the start of the first Nuremberg S-Bahn service by the Deutsche Bundesbahn.

The  office complex, the headquarters of the Nürnberger Versicherung insurance company, is adjacent to the station.

References

Ostring
Ostring
Railway stations in Germany opened in 1987